The 1872 Maine gubernatorial election was held on September 9, 1872. Incumbent Republican Governor Sidney Perham defeated the Democratic candidate Charles P. Kimball.

General election

Candidates

Republican 

 Sidney Perham

Democratic 

 Charles P. Kimball

Results

References 

Maine gubernatorial elections
Maine
1872 Maine elections